Nathan Mortimore Newmark (September 22, 1910 – January 25, 1981) was an American structural engineer and academic, who is widely considered one of the founding fathers of earthquake engineering. He was awarded the National Medal of Science for engineering.

Early life
Newmark was born in Plainfield, New Jersey to a Jewish couple, Abraham and Mollie Newmark. After receiving his early education in North Carolina and New Jersey, he went on to attend Rutgers University. Newmark graduated from Rutgers in 1930 earning high honors and special honors in civil engineering. He married Anne Cohen in 1931.

Newmark then attended graduate school at the University of Illinois at Urbana–Champaign, where he worked under Hardy Cross, Harold M. Westergaard, and Frank E. Richart.

At the University of Illinois
In 1932 he received a M.S. degree and in 1934 a Ph.D. degrees for thesis titled Interaction between rib and superstructure in concrete arch bridges, in civil engineering from the University of Illinois at Urbana–Champaign. After graduating from UIUC, Newmark was appointed to many prestigious positions in the department. He became Research Professor of Civil Engineering in 1943. He served as Chairman of the Digital Computer Laboratory of the university from 1947 to 1957 and in 1956 he was appointed head of the Civil Engineering Department and held the position until 1973. Newmark held many important leadership positions and the reputation of the longest tenure on the University Research Board. He continued as a professor there until he retired with a rank of professor emeritus. Under his leadership, the program at the University of Illinois at Urbana–Champaign soared to new heights. The civil engineering laboratory on campus now bears his name.

Newmark was the advisor or coadvisor of the following students who completed their Ph.D. in Civil Engineering, Graduate College, University of Illinois at Urbana–Champaign:

Achievements
During World War II Newmark consulted for the National Defense Research Committee and the Office of Scientific Research and Development, for which in 1948 he received the President's Certificate of Merit. He served on numerous Department of Defense boards and panels, with major contributions to the Minute Man and MX missile systems.

In 1959, Newmark introduced what became known as the Newmark-beta method of numerical integration used to solve differential equations. The method is still widely used in numerical evaluation of the dynamic response of structures and solids, such as in Finite element analysis.  He later helped to develop the first digital computers, the ILLIAC II, which was one of the first transistorized computers. It was also designed to use transistors that were not even invented yet. The ILLIAC-II eventually led to the development of computer software for engineering.

Another of Newmark's achievements was the Torre Latinoamericana (Latin American Tower) in Mexico City, Mexico, the tallest building in Mexico City until 1984.  Newmark was the consulting engineer on the project.  He designed the building to be supported by the muddy soil underneath the structure and be able to withstand earthquakes. The design was put to the test in 1957 when an earthquake struck the city, and again in the stronger earthquake of 1985. The Torre Latinoamericana withstood the quakes and is still standing today as a witness of progress in earthquake engineering. He also developed the seismic design criteria for other large projects including the Bay Area Rapid Transit System, Trans-Alaska Pipeline System, the proposed Alaskan Natural Gas Pipeline, and about 70 nuclear power plants.

Throughout his career Newmark developed a simple, yet powerful and widely used method for analyzing complex structural components and assemblies under a variety of conditions of loading and for calculating the stresses and deformations in soil beneath foundations.  He also was an engineer on the construction of the Trans-Alaska Pipeline. Since there was an oil and energy shortage, high unemployment rate, and high inflation in the 1970s, the country had to do something to help conserve and utilize the natural resources available to them inside the country. Once oil was discovered in Alaska, there was a need for a design to get the oil quickly and efficiently down to the refineries.  The Alaskan terrain offered many diverse challenges for a normal underground pipeline, thus Newmark was consulted to design sections of the pipeline near the fault lines. Since Newmark had done numerous studies on the effect of earthquakes on structures, he had the ideal background to tackle such a revolutionary feat.

Newmark also made significant contributions to geotechnical engineering. He developed a new method, named after him (Newmark's sliding block method)  of calculating displacements in earth dams and slopes due to earthquakes. His work was acknowledged with an invitation to deliver the 5th Rankine Lecture of the British Geotechnical Association, entitled Effects of earthquakes on dams and embankments.

The American Concrete Institute awarded Newmark the Wason Medal for Most Meritorious Paper in 1950. In 1968, he was recipient of the National Medal of Science for Engineering Sciences.  He was elected Fellow of the American Academy of Arts and Sciences (1962), and received the 1979 John Fritz Medal and several other awards. The American Society of Civil Engineers has named a medal after him, which is awarded "to a member of the American Society of Civil Engineers who, through contributions in structural mechanics, has helped substantially to strengthen the scientific base of structural engineering." In 1964 he contributed to the founding the National Academy of Engineering (NAE) and two years later became a member of National Academy of Sciences (NAS).

Hardy Cross
Hardy Cross, who Newmark worked under at the University of Illinois in Urbana, developed the moment distribution method. It enabled designers to calculate statically indeterminate frames of reinforced concrete.  Newmark looked up to Cross; in Cross's book Arches, Continuous Frames, Columns and Conduits, Newmark wrote the introduction, in which he tells how much he enjoyed the classes taught by Cross and how they would sometimes walk home together after classes and discuss engineering principles.

References

External links
 National Academy of Engineering memorial tribute
 British Geotechnical Association - Rankine Lecturers
 

IStructE Gold Medal winners
1910 births
1981 deaths
20th-century American engineers
Earthquake engineering
Jewish American scientists
National Medal of Science laureates
University of Illinois Urbana-Champaign faculty
Founding members of the United States National Academy of Engineering
Fellows of the American Academy of Arts and Sciences
Rankine Lecturers
Members of the United States National Academy of Sciences
20th-century American Jews